Mega Dragon and Tiger is a manhua graphic novel series by Wong Yuk-Long. The series was translated then published under one American distributor's (then) for Asian comics, ComicsOne, lost for 2005. With the first volume in English being releashed 2002. Whereas the original had been releashed in Hong Kong under Jade Dynasty Publications Limited in 1995.

The story is set in a futuristic post-apocalyptic world, where individuals compete in a gladiatorial event called the "Best of The Best Championships" to obtain eternal glory. Mega Dragon and Tiger like its name suggests, focuses on the two main characters in the story, Dragon and Tiger.

Prelude 
"Sixty five million years ago, dinosaurs ruled the world. And then came a massive asteroid many miles across. It struck earth with the destructive force of a million nuclear bombs. The planet was horribly scarred. Massive earthquakes, tidal waves and volcanic eruptions quickly eradicated most of the life on the surface of the world. The reign of dinosaurs came to an abrupt end. Only their fossils remain to us of their existence. Millions of years later, new life slowly gained a foothold on the land. In time... man appeared and claimed the earth for his species".

Switch to present day. Hong Kong, June 30, 11:00 PM, 1999.

"The night sky turns swiftly to day as new light blossoms above, ten times brighter than the sun! A swarm of meteorites enter the atmosphere, each the size of a mountain. The doom of 65 million years ago rains down once more. They burn incandescent, super-heated by the atmosphere. Each one a parcel of death... The first one hits Hong Kong with the force of ten nuclear bombs. In seconds, the pearl of the east is vaporized. And all around the world... Humans and animals are exterminated in an instant. Everything natural or man-made suffers the same fate. The resulting earthquakes, tidal waves and volcanic eruptions lay waste to anything in their path. Most of the world falls victim to a biblical firestorm. Some of the meteors were composed of radioactive material. The dust from their explosions darkens the skies with a hot, deadly cloud. And the once blue planet earth becomes a flaming red ball".

"But not all were destroyed in this tragedy. Green dots appeared around the fiery globe. Heaven's curtain extends for one thousand miles, providing impervious protection from the intense firestorm outside. The choking clouds of dust that blanket the earth slowly dissipate over time. Ten years after the apocalypse the clouds that blocked the sun are gone and the blue sky has returned. Heaven's curtain was created by thousands of broadcasting stations, each generating a unified magnetic force field through the use of lasers. When the atmosphere was deemed clear of deadly dust storms, heaven's curtain was opened. The old world was gone for good".

Switch to land of paradise, 2009.

"Ten years after the sky fell; this once undeveloped island now boasts a bustling metropolis. A high-tech ark of human civilization, glittering in the sun! Over two million citizens of paradise rejoice madly in the streets. More than two hundred thousand gathered at the pavilion to hear their leader speak".

"The average human being uses six percent of his brain power. Ninety-four percent remains as untapped potential. Edison and Einstein were two of the greatest minds of the 20th century. Both exceeded the six percent mark by a wide margin".

President bates issues compulsory brain law exams, to test brain power.

"Citizens dutifully follow the president's decree. New decree. Those over the age of ten who showed less than eight percent brain development were banished from the land of paradise. Bates said only the best of the best deserved citizenship. Over 500 thousand people were forced to leave their homes. These people were sent into the wastelands. But they found it was not deserted. Some had managed to survive the apocalypse. These survivors had formed violent tribes which terrorized anyone who was unable to defend themselves. Some of these wasteland survivors had been mutated by radiation from the space debris. It had warped their minds, as well, turning them into violent killers. Some developed the power to control minds, and used it for evil purposes.

But then came the second decree of president bates...

Colonization. "A regent rules each colony through the use of terror and extremism, the citizens if the wastelands were named the, unworthy ones. Soon the waste-land survivors became slaves. None could stand up against the technological might of the paradise military. They conquered the world in no time. Their only hope for redemption was to enter, the challenge. The winner of these contests was sent to paradise as a contender in the, best of the best championships. Since the year 2010. Fighters from around the world have gathered at paradise stadium on July 1 to compete in the championship. President bates hosts the event with all high-ranking military and dignitaries in attendance. It's the sixth annual, best of the best tournament. After several rounds of competition, two men face off for the top honour.

Prelude end.

Characters

Primary characters

 Tiger Yin
 Tiger is the main protagonist of the story. He used to live in paradise, but two years before the story begins, at the age of 13 his brain power rapidly decreases to 7% therefore he is removed from the school for gifted and he and his mother are forced away to live in exile in Tibet. Here Tiger lives with his grandfather, Dr. Yin. He learns his family martial arts based on the ancient gods my of which are based on close quarters attacks penetrating the opponents defences. He also is able to relive several past lives that power him up considerably. He later dies horribly after losing the tournament

 Dragon
 The other protagonist, formerly friends with Tiger. Unlike his friend he utilises a technological armour style based on titanium. that acts like a cloak/skin when activated. Dragon too is able to relive a past life (one that reveals that Dragon and Tiger were both enemies in the past) Through this he combines his new style with his past lifes ancient Golden Bell style to create even stronger armour. Eventually manages to win through use of new technology, determination and thinking. He then hopes to avenge his friend.

Other Characters 
 William Bates
 An obvious play in "Bill Gates". Drives technology forward is the de facto "benevolent" prime minister but hides secrets.

 Evil Staff
 Evil Staff is a finalist in the sixth annual best of the best tournament. He has long blonde hair, wears a metal mask with horns and wears red clothing. He is equipped with a energized staff which can generate up to 20,000 volts of electricity. His greatest fighting attributes are his demonic speed and his extreme reflexes. His brain power is at 17%.

 Single-Minded Arhat
 Single-Minded Arhat or Arhat, is the other finalist in the sixth annual best of the best tournament. He is tall, very muscular man with blonde overgrown facial hair and eyebrows. His combat revolves around the use of his, titanium body. which transforms his skin into a living form of metal armor, thus granting him invulnerability. This is demonstrated in his battle with Evil Staff, where he is hit hundreds of times, yet feels little to no pain. He eventually kills Evil staff, when he activates his level 2 titanium body and uses one of his ultimate techniques, titanium muddle, to rip his opponent to shreds.

 After his victory, he is crowned champion and given Tibet to rule over. He is proven to be a cruel, merciless dictator. The one thousand troops under his command, rob and rape with abandon, many citizens are enslaved and he over taxes the rest so he can build his own fortress.

 He is obsessed with power. When he discovers Tiger, it excites him and his wishes to engage him in combat to test his own abilities. In his final battle with Tiger he is killed, when Tiger uses one of his special techniques, "the thousand limbs of guan yin". His brain power stands at 18% when fighting evil staff, when he activates the 3rd level of his titanium body when fighting Tiger it increases to 20%.

References

Hong Kong comics titles
Martial arts comics
Post-apocalyptic comics
1995 comics debuts